The 1984 GWA Mazda Tennis Classic was a men's tennis tournament played on indoor carpet courts in Brisbane, Queensland in Australia that was part of the 1984 Volvo Grand Prix. It was the second edition of the tournament and was held from 1 October through 7 October 1984. First-seeded Eliot Teltscher won the singles title.

Finals

Singles
 Eliot Teltscher defeated  Francisco González 3–6, 6–3, 6–4
 It was Teltscher's 1st singles title of the year and the 8th of his career.

Doubles
 Francisco González /  Matt Mitchell defeated  Broderick Dyke /  Wally Masur 6–7, 6–2, 7–5

References

External links
 ITF tournament edition details

GWA Mazda Tennis Classic
GWA Mazda Tennis Classic, 1983
GWA Mazda Tennis Classic
GWA Mazda Tennis Classic
Sports competitions in Brisbane
Tennis in Queensland